Gerard Autet Serrabasa (born 8 September 1978) is a Spanish former footballer who played as a central defender.

Club career
Autet was born in Manlleu, Barcelona, Catalonia. During his early career, he played lower league football with Palamós CF and RCD Espanyol's B team. He subsequently represented Levante UD and Xerez CD, with both clubs competing in the second division.

After five seasons in Andalusia, Autet signed with Sporting de Gijón for the 2007–08 season, being an instrumental figure in the side's promotion to La Liga. His competition debut on 21 September 2008 was a sour one, as the Asturians were crushed 1–6 at home against FC Barcelona and he was sent off before the hour-mark; he did contribute solidly in the club's narrow escape from relegation, appearing in 26 games and scoring in a 2–1 home win over Málaga CF on 17 May 2009.

Only third or fourth-string stopper in the 2009–10 campaign, Autet played only eight league matches, mainly due to suspensions or injuries to either Grégory Arnolin or Alberto Botía. He did start in all of those (seven complete) as Sporting again managed to retain their top-flight status.

References

External links

1978 births
Living people
People from Osona
Sportspeople from the Province of Barcelona
Spanish footballers
Footballers from Catalonia
Association football defenders
La Liga players
Segunda División players
Segunda División B players
Tercera División players
FC Barcelona C players
Palamós CF footballers
RCD Espanyol B footballers
RCD Espanyol footballers
Levante UD footballers
Xerez CD footballers
Sporting de Gijón players
Spanish expatriate sportspeople in Israel